Custodial capture is a technical term in board games referring to a particular form of capturing.

It occurs when a player has placed two of his pieces on opposite sides of an opponent's piece. This mode of capture is unusual in most modern games and was most popular during the Dark Ages, particularly in Northern Europe. Some native games such as Mak-yek still retain this form of capture.
Other games which use custodian capture: Hasami shogi, Ludus latrunculorum, Tafl games

Board game terminology